CTLS can refer to:

Center for Transnational Legal Studies, a global educational center for the study of transnational law
Marmon-Herrington CTLS (Combat Tank Light Series), a series of World War II-era U.S. light tanks
Flight Design CTLS, a German light sport aircraft
CTLS, a fictional television station in Toronto, Canada, on the TV series E.N.G.

See also
CTL (disambiguation)